Monksthorpe is a hamlet in the district of East Lindsey, Lincolnshire, England.

Monksthorpe chapel is a Grade II* listed building dating from 1701,  now in the care of the National Trust. In the grounds is a Grade II* listed open air total submersion font,  believed to be one of only two in the country.

References

External links

Hamlets in Lincolnshire
East Lindsey District